The 2017–18 French Basketball Cup season was the 41st season of the domestic cup competition of French basketball. The competition started on 19 September 2017 and ended 21 April 2018. SIG Strasbourg won its second Cup title.

Bracket

See also
2017–18 Pro A season
2017–18 Pro B season

References

External links
French Basketball Federation Official Site 

French Basketball Cup
Cup